, also known as jōdan-gamae, and frequently shortened simply to jōdan, is a basic kenjutsu posture. (It is also found in naginatajutsu but is far less used due to the length of the weapon involved.) Jōdan-no-kamae means upper-level posture (lit. 'high/upper degree posture').

Kendo
Jōdan-no-kamae is one of the five stances in kendo: jōdan, chūdan, gedan, hassō and waki.  In jōdan-no-kamae, the sword is raised above the head with the tip (kissaki; 切先) pointing back and the blade facing up, in readiness to strike. It is the most aggressive stance of the five.

There are commonly two types of jōdan-no-kamae, left (hidari; 左) and right (migi; 右), referring to which foot is out in front.  As a more rare case, only one hand is used to hold the sword.  Even rarer, the positions of the hands on the hilt of the sword may be reversed.

In normal practice or competitions, left (hidari) jōdan-gamae is the most common.  Its advantage is the reach of the strike, the intimidating posture and the speed of the strike.  Its disadvantage is the weak defense, since the throat, wrists and body are open.  In order to protect the vulnerable area, a jōdan user must have a very fiery spirit to "scare off" the opponent.  It is also more difficult to judge the striking distance (maai; 間合い).  Therefore, this stance is only used as the normal stance during practice or competition by experienced kendōka (剣道家).

Both jōdan-no-kamae positions are used in Nihon Kendo Kata.

Kenjutsu

As one of the most basic postures, jōdan-no-kamae is common to virtually all schools of kenjutsu.  The primary attribute of jōdan-no-kamae is always the weapon lifted above the head of the practitioner. One of the only significant variations is the relative position of the elbows.  Some styles, such as aiki-ken, prefer the elbows to be as far inward as possible.  Many others insist on the elbows being open.

European schools of swordsmanship

Similar stances to Jōdan-no-kamae are also found in German and Italian schools of the longsword.  It is known as Dach ("roof") and bocca di falcone ("falcon's beak") respectively.  One-handed variants also exist for the single sword (Schwert) and falchion (Messer).  Another tradition that includes this posture is the English master George Silver's teachings, where it is known as the "open fight."

In German traditions such as Liechtenauer this is called center vom Tag. It is often translated as "day" or "from the roof".

In Italian traditions such as Bolognese-Dardi this would be referred to as Guardia Alta or High Guard.

Notes and references

Kendo stances